Karen Helen Wiltshire (born 1962) is an Irish environmental scientist. She is professor for shelf-ecosystems and one of the vice directors of Alfred Wegener Institute for Polar and Marine Research (AWI).

Born in Dublin, Wiltshire studied at Trinity College Dublin and graduated with a master's degree in environmental science. She received her Ph.D. and habilitation (2001) in hydrobiology at the University of Hamburg.

Wiltshire supports Scientists for Future in Germany and took part in a statement at the Bundespressekonferenz in March 2019.

Publications
 The fractionation of phosphorus in sediments of the river Elbe under anaerobic conditions, 1988
 Experimental procedures for the fractionation of phosphorus in sediments with emphasis on anaerobic techniques, 1992
 The influence of microphytobenthos on oxygen and nutrient fluxes between eulittoral sediments and associated water phases in the Elbe estuary, 1992

References

Irish women academics
Academic staff of the University of Bremen
University of Hamburg alumni
Living people
1962 births
Alumni of Trinity College Dublin